Damogen Furies is the fourteenth studio album by British electronic musician Squarepusher. It was announced on 18 February 2015 and released on 20 April 2015. Along with the announcement of the album, the third track, "Rayc Fire 2", was released for free on Squarepusher's site, on which a series of live dates in support of the album were also announced.

Critical reception

Daryl Keating of Exclaim! wrote that Damogen Furies is "a scattershot release, but one that's definitely worth exploring," citing "a return to the jazz-fuelled, IDM-inflected drum & bass of Squarepusher's heyday" while also remaining "stuck in the fantasy world that has marred his last few releases."

Track listing
The track listing below is as presented on the CD. On the double LP release, the track listing is reversed.

Charts

References

External links
 

Squarepusher albums
2015 albums
Warp (record label) albums